Rebecca Parris (December 28, 1951 – June 17, 2018) was an American jazz singer. During her career she appeared with Count Basie, Buddy Rich, Wynton Marsalis, Gary Burton, and Dizzy Gillespie. She performed at the Monterey Jazz Festival, North Sea Jazz Festival, Oslo Jazz Festival, and the International Floating Jazz Festival. She won the Boston Music Awards nine times.

Critical reception
"I hear a little Carmen McRae when I listen to Rebecca", said Ron DellaChiesa, the jazz disk jockey at WGBH in Boston. "And a little Sarah Vaughan. I think she's on that level".

"Sarah Vaughan and Carmen McRae were my friends while they were alive, and it was a huge blessing to know them," said Parris. "And being accepted as one of them was huge".

Death
On June 17, 2018, Parris died at the age of 66.

Discography

References

External links
Official website

1951 births
2018 deaths
American jazz singers
American women jazz singers
People from Newton, Massachusetts
Singers from Massachusetts
20th-century American singers
20th-century American women singers
21st-century American singers
21st-century American women singers
Jazz musicians from Massachusetts